Auksė Treinytė-Dauderienė (born 30 July 1952 in Vilnius) is a Lithuanian former sport shooter who competed for the Soviet Union. Former world record holder.

References

1952 births
Living people
Lithuanian female sport shooters
Sportspeople from Vilnius
Vilnius Gediminas Technical University alumni